Bert W. M. Twaalfhoven (born August 13, 1928) is an  entrepreneur and venture capitalist from Hilversum, the Netherlands.

Early life and education
Twaalfhoven was born and raised in The Hague (Den Haag), the Netherlands. His teenage years were disrupted by World War II, during which his home was bombed and his mother injured.  In 1947 Twaalfhoven graduated from the high school Aloysius College, in The Hague. He moved to the United States of America in the summer of 1948. Twaalfhoven received a scholarship at Fordham University in New York, and worked as a dishwasher, waiter, chauffeur and fruit-picker during the four years of his education. He was on the International Soccer team at Fordham University as well.

In 1952 Twaalfhoven graduated with a Bachelor of Science from Fordham, and was awarded a scholarship at the University of Harvard, and graduated there in 1954 with an MBA.

Family and personal
Twaalfhoven married Maria Somary in Zurich, Switzerland in 1954. The couple moved in 1955 to Town of Mount Royal, Montreal, Canada, where their first two children were born. A third child was born in 1958 while the family was living in Long Island, NY. Five more children were born after the family moved to the Netherlands. Twaalfhoven and his wife formed the first parent-teacher organizations in North Holland. Maria Somary dies at 7 February 2020.

Career in business
In 1957 Twaalfhoven worked on Wall Street, New York to gain experience in the financial industry. Using money inherited by his wife, he purchased a farm in Quebec with 120 cows. Twaalfhoven used the then unknown method of Artificial Insemination, and in five years raised cows that increased milk production by 100%.

Twaalfhoven's sold the farm in 1958 and moved his family to Hilversum, The Netherlands, where he started a business, setting up the first laundromats in northwestern Europe.

In 1993 Twaalfhoven received an honorary doctorate from the Fordham University for his achievements in the area of education and as an international entrepreneur.  In 2001 he received the Annual Alumni Award from Harvard Business School for his activities stimulating entrepreneurship in Eastern and Western Europe. He has been a chairman of Harvard Business School Alumni.

Through his company Indivers B.V., Twaalfhoven started 54 businesses in the countries Italy, France, Germany, Russia, Ukraine, Holland, Belgium, England, U.S.A., Singapore and China. Of these businesses, 17 failed. Twaalfhoven was the co-founder of the first venture capital company in The Netherlands, known as Gilde.

Some of the businesses Twaalfhoven founded include:
 Indivers B.V. 
 European Forum (Foundation) for Entrepreneurship Research (EFER)
 Aluminium Extruders Harderwijk (later Reynolds and now Alcoa
 Interturbine Group
 Europe's 500
 Wasserette (Laundromats) - The Netherlands, Germany, Switzerland and Belgium
 Ribby Dry Cleaning
 Autowasserette (Car wash) - The Netherlands and Belgium
 MIFA
 Almax - The Netherlands, France, Italy, UK
 Danvers Seals
 Dayton Process
 Elbar - Argentina, Boston, Hickham, The Netherlands, Poland, Singapore, Wood
 Eldim (later known as Sulzer Eldim B.V.) - Boston, The Netherlands

Twaalfhoven published his own book, Learn Earn Return: The Journey of a Global Entrepreneur, in April 2013 through EFER.

Maps
Twaalfhoven is a collector of 16th, 17th and 18th century maps, and has donated 22 of these to Fordham University Libraries.

References

External links
 http://www.efer.eu/
 http://www.gilde.nl/
 The Maps of  Bert Twaalfhoven From the Fordham University Libraries

1928 births
Living people
Businesspeople from The Hague
Venture capitalists